The Iaşi-Gorj oil field is an oil field located in Drăguțești, Gorj County. It was discovered in 1964 and developed by Petrom. It began production in 1965 and produces oil.

References

Oil fields in Romania